Jing of Jin may refer to:

Marquis Jing of Jin (died 841 BC)
Duke Jing of Jin (Ju) (晉景公, died 581 BC), personal name Ju
Duke Jing of Jin (Jiao) (晉敬公, died 434 BC), personal name Jiao, also called Duke Ai or Duke Yi of Jin
Duke Jing of Jin (Jujiu) (晉静公, died the 4th century BC), personal name Jujiu
Sima Shi (208–255), posthumously honored as Emperor Jing of Jin